The de Havilland DH.61 Giant Moth was a 1920s British large single-engined biplane transport built by de Havilland at Stag Lane Aerodrome, Edgware. Intended primarily for use in Australia, a number were also shipped to Canada.

Design

Following the success of the de Havilland DH.50J in Australia, the company was asked to design a larger replacement using a Bristol Jupiter engine. The cabin had room for six to eight passengers with the pilot in an open cockpit behind the wings. The aircraft took only 10 weeks to design and the prototype first flew in December 1927. A total of 10 aircraft were built, including one in Canada built from components, with the rest coming from the Stag Lane production line.

A Pathé News clip claims it was the "first commercial plane with folding wings!" and shows a single man folding them.

Operational history

Australia and New Guinea
Following test flights in England, the aircraft was sent to de Havilland Australia in Melbourne. After reassembly, the prototype first flew on 2 March 1928 and was used on scheduled services between Adelaide and Broken Hill by MacRobertson Miller Aviation. The prototype was originally called Canberra, which was used as a type name until it was changed to Giant Moth.

Another (registration G-AUHW) followed in November 1928, but crashed at Cowes, Victoria, before it was delivered 
to the purchaser, Airgold Ltd. After repairs, it was bought by Les Holden in 1928 for his charter service, based in Mascot, New South Wales. He christened her Canberra. Already a World War I flying ace, he (and Canberra) would be in the news the next year.

In 1929, Australian aviation pioneers Charles Kingsford Smith and Charles Ulm set out on a Fokker F.VII trimotor monoplane named Southern Cross from Sydney for England. When radio contact was lost, a search was organised. In April 1929, Australian National Airways or the Sydney Citizens' Relief Committee engaged Holden to join the search. Simply getting to the area was difficult. Before the flight from Sydney to Wyndham, an extra 70-gallon petrol tank and a radio were installed. Even with the additional tank, Holden had to stop and find petrol and oil along the way. On 4 or 5 April 1929, Holden, Aero Club ground engineer F. R. Mitchell, Dr. G. R. Hamilton and wireless operator L. S. W. Stannage set out aboard Canberra. According to one newspaper article, Holden flew a total of 9000 miles (14,500 km) and was in the air for 100 hours, before spotting the missing aircraft on a mud flat near the Gleneig River. The crew of Southern Cross were rescued, though two other searchers lost their lives.

QANTAS acquired two Giant Moths, Apollo (G-AUJB) and Diana (G-AUJC), in April and May 1929, respectively. They were the first QANTAS aircraft equipped with toilets. The airline took them out of service in 1935 because the Bristol Jupiter XI engines were unreliable. Apollo was sold that year and crashed near Mubo, New Guinea, on 9 May 1938.

Canada
Three aircraft for Canada (G-CAPG), (G-CARD) and (G-CAJT) were fitted with Short Brothers floats at Rochester before one was delivered to Canadian Vickers. This aircraft (G-CAJT) was sent to Western Canada Airlines Ltd. on a rental arrangement. During a proving flight on 23 October 1928, the Giant Moth suffered structural damage in the air and crashed at Calgary, Alberta in a non-fatal accident. The other DH.61s continued to fly in Ontario in fire-fighting operations. One Giant Moth (CF-OAK) was modified from parts and flew with a Pratt & Witney Hornet engine.

United Kingdom
Geraldine (G-AAAN) was bought by the Daily Mail to carry a photographer and his motorcycle around the United Kingdom. The aircraft would land at the nearest airfield to the story. This aircraft was also equipped with a dark room to enable the photographs to be developed on the return journey. Later, it was sold to National Flying Services and renamed Leone. Western Australian Airways acquired it in the early 1930s; it served Western Australia from 1931 to 1935. When the airline encountered financial difficulties, the Giant Moth was sold to New Guinea Airlines. G-AAAN crashed on 20 August 1935, while landing at Wau, New Guinea.

Youth of Britain (G-AAEV), modified to carry 10 passengers, was used by Sir Alan Cobham in an aviation promotional tour of the United Kingdom lasting 21 weeks and ending on 7 October 1929. Cobham flew , visited 110 towns and took aloft 40,000 passengers, including 10,000 schoolchildren free of charge. Among those who experienced their first flight in Cobham's Giant Moth was Eric Lock, who became a Royal Air Force fighter ace during the Battle of Britain.

After the tour, Cobham sold the Giant Moth to Imperial Airways, to be used for survey flights. Its use was short-lived; G-AAEV was lost in a crash landing by Charles Wolley-Dod on 19 January 1930.

Operators

 Guinea Airways Ltd.
 Holden Air Transport Ltd.
 MacRobertson Miller Airlines
 Qantas
 West Australian Airlines Ltd.

Varig

Avianca

London Air Transport Ltd.
Ontario Provincial Air Services
Western Canada Airways Ltd.

Alan Cobham Aviation Ltd.
Associated Newspapers Ltd.
Imperial Airways Ltd. 
National Flying Services Ltd.

Specifications

References

Notes

Bibliography
 The Illustrated Encyclopedia of Aircraft (Part Work 1982-1985). London: Orbis Publishing, 1985.
 Jackson, A.J. De Havilland Aircraft since 1909. London: Putnam, Third edition, 1987. .
 Molson, K.M. Pioneering in Canadian Air Transport. Winnipeg, Manitoba, Canada: James Richardson & Sons, Ltd., 1974. .

Further reading

External links
 DH 61 Giant Moth, Canadian Bushplane Heritage Centre
 Pathé News clip showing passengers and luggage being placed aboard

Biplanes
Single-engined tractor aircraft
1920s British civil utility aircraft
Giant Moth
Aircraft first flown in 1927